The Red and White is the fourth studio album by Canadian country music artist Julian Austin. It was released by LMG Records in 2007. "He's Got What It Takes," the title track, "Harbour Town," "Back to Me" and "Marie" were released as singles.

Track listing
"He's Got What It Takes" (Julian Austin, Kelly Sitter, Kenny Sitter, Stephen Robichaud, Barry Mathers) – 3:11
"Good Life" (Austin, Robichaud) – 4:06
"I Just Can't Do" (Austin, Robichaud, Mathers) – 4:04
"Marie" (Austin, John Landry, Rich Baker) – 3:34
"Harbour Town" (Austin, Mathers) – 3:42
"Back to Me" (Austin) – 3:46
"Pretty as a Rose" (Austin, Mathers) – 3:52
"Crickle Creek River" (Austin, Robichaud, Mathers, Gil Grand) – 4:19
"Class of '89" (Austin, Robichaud, Mathers, Bill Buckingham) – 3:51
"The Red and White" (Austin) – 3:47

External links
[ The Red & White] at Allmusic

2007 albums
Julian Austin (musician) albums